This is a list of events from British radio in 1925.

Events
27 July – The British Broadcasting Company's Daventry transmitting station on Borough Hill, Daventry in central England opens as the world's first longwave broadcast radio transmitter, taking over from its Chelmsford facility.

Births
25 May – Derek Cooper, food writer and broadcaster (died 2014)
15 June – Richard Baker, broadcaster (died 2018)
28 July – Kenneth Alwyn, orchestral conductor (died 2020)
8 September – Peter Sellers, comic actor (died 1980)
19 September – Pete Murray, DJ
22 September – William Franklyn, actor (died 2006)
27 October – Monica Sims, radio executive (died 2018)
11 November – June Whitfield, comic actress (died 2018)

References 

 
Years in British radio
Radio